Centro Valle Intelvi is a comune (municipality) in the Province of Como in the Italian region Lombardy. It was created on 1 January 2018 after the merger of the former comuni of Casasco d'Intelvi, Castiglione d'Intelvi and San Fedele Intelvi.

References

Cities and towns in Lombardy